Guraleus australis is a species of sea snail, a marine gastropod mollusk in the family Mangeliidae.

This species was considered a variety of Mangilia mitralis ( = Guraleus mitralis) by Pritchard and Gatliff in 1900

Description
The length of the shell attains 16 mm.

Distribution
This marine species is endemic to Australia and can be found off New South Wales, South Australia, Western Australia and Tasmania.

References

 Adams, A. & Angas, G.F. 1864. Descriptions of new species from Australian seas, in the collection of George French Angas. Proceedings of the Zoological Society of London 1863(III): 418–428, pl. xxxvii 
 Hedley, C. 1913. Studies of Australian Mollusca. Part XI;  Proceedings of the Linnean Society of New South Wales 38 
  Hedley, C. 1922. A revision of the Australian Turridae. Records of the Australian Museum 13(6): 213–359, pls 42–56

External links
  Sowerby, G.B., III. (1896) List of the Pleurotomidae of South Australia, with descriptions of some new species. Proceedings of the Malacological Society of London, 2, 24–32, pl. 3 
  Tucker, J.K. 2004 Catalog of recent and fossil turrids (Mollusca: Gastropoda). Zootaxa 682:1–1295.
 

australis
Gastropods described in 1864
Gastropods of Australia